Yang Jie (7 April 1929 - 15 April 2017) was a Chinese television director and producer best known for her work Journey to the West, adapted from the 16th century Ming dynasty novelist Wu Cheng'en's classical novel of the same title.

Early life and education
Yang was born in Sichuan, on April 7, 1929, to Yang Bokai, a political activist, and Wei Shuyuan.

In 1945, she was sent to Yan'an, then she was accepted to Huabei Union University (now Renmin University of China). After graduation, she joined the People's Liberation Army. She was assigned to broadcasting stations as an announcer.

After the establishment of the Communist State in 1954, she was transferred to Beijing, where she worked at the Central People's Broadcasting Station (now China National Radio). In 1958 she entered the China Central Television.

Career
Yang made her directorial debut Sweet Handkerchief in 1976.

In 1980, she was signed to direct the fantasy television series Journey to the West, based on the classical novel of the same title by the 16th century Ming dynasty novelist Wu Cheng'en. The series has been replayed almost 3,000 times every year on various Chinese Television channels and has received 6 billion views in the three decades.  In 1988, Yang won Best Director at the Golden Eagle Awards, the China Television Artists Association's equivalent to the Emmys, for her work on Journey to the West. It also won the prize for Best Long Series at the 8th Flying Apsaras Awards, which recognize excellent Chinese TV programs.

In 1993, she directed the historical television series Zhu Yuanzhang.  The drama stars Lü Qi as Hongwu Emperor, alongside Zhang Ying, Ye Qinglin, Wen Bodong, Cui Weining, Li Tang and Liu Falu.

In 1995, Yang was confirmed as director of Xi Shi. Based on the life of Xi Shi, it stars Jiang Qinqin as Xi Shi and Zhang Qiuge as Goujian, with Kou Zhenhai and Xu Shaohua. That same year, she also hired as director of Sima Qian. The series stars Qiu Yongli as Sima Qian, alongside Xu Huanshan, Zhang Qiuge, Wang Quanyou, and Xu Shaohua.

In 2000, she directed Journey to the West (Season 2), sequel to Journey to the West.

Death
On April 15, 2017, Yang died of cardiovascular disease in Beijing.

Personal life
Yang was twice married. She had three children (two daughters and one son) with her former husband Zhou Chuanji, a director and professor at Beijing Film Academy.

In 1969 Yang was married to Wang Chongqiu, the cinematographer of Journey to the West. The couple had a daughter named Yang Yunfei.

Filmography

Television

Books

Lyric
 "Feminine Emotional"

References

External links
 

1929 births
2017 deaths
Renmin University of China alumni
Chinese television directors
Chinese television producers
Writers from Nanchong
People's Republic of China writers
People of the Republic of China